Kiran Abbavaram (born 15 July 1992) is an Indian actor who works in Telugu films. He made his debut with a love story Raja Vaaru Rani Gaaru in 2019, and wrote and starred in the film SR Kalyanamandapam (2021).

Early life
Kiran Abbavaram was born on 15 July 1992 in Rayachoti, Andhra Pradesh. He is a B. Tech graduate and worked as a network consultant for 2-and-a-half years in Chennai and Bangalore. He started doing short films while working and later left his job to pursue a full-time career in films. One of his short films, Sreekaram was remade into a feature film with the same name in 2021.

Career
Kiran Abbavaram made his debut with Raja Vaaru Rani Gaaru (2019). Sangeetha Devi of The Hindu in her review stated: "Abbavaram shows he is no longer a mere YouTube or a short film sensation — he has the looks and promises to be a part of good stories and movies." He got greater recognition and appreciation with his second film SR Kalyanamandapam, which he also wrote. The film received positive reviews from the critics and was a box office success.

In 2022, Abbavaram had two releases—Sebastian P.C. 524 and Sammathame. Murali Krishna CH of The New Indian Express called Sebastian a half-hearted drama but opined Abbavaram's performance was its biggest strength.

Filmography

References

Male actors in Telugu cinema
Indian male film actors
21st-century Indian male actors
Living people
Telugu male actors
People from Kadapa district
Male actors from Andhra Pradesh
1992 births
Screenwriters from Andhra Pradesh
Telugu screenwriters

External links